Commodifying Cannabis: A Cultural History of a Complex Plant in the Atlantic World is a 2018 nonfiction book by Bradley J Borougerdi about the historical and present commodification of Cannabis by society and the industry. It examines in particular "the connection between ancient uses of cannabis and our more recent social and cultural contexts" in the Anglo-American Atlantic world, and "the trajectory of cannabis commodification in the early modern period, the prohibition of cannabis in the nineteenth century, and the recent re-commodification of cannabis". The book, incorporating three centuries of source material, is based on the author's Ph.D. dissertation "Cord of Empire, Exotic Intoxicant: Hemp and Culture in the Atlantic World, 1600–1900". Borougerdi received his degree from University of Texas at Austin Department of History, advised by Christopher Morris.

Reception
The book is one of six books selected in Florida Gulf Coast University's cannabis industry research guide, and one of three business books in the cannabis research guide, "Recommended sources to research the business of cannabis" at the University of Washington Libraries.

A review published by the Alcohol and Drugs History Society and the American Institute of the History of Pharmacy said the book provides valuable insight about the importance of "global knowledge flows to our understanding of cultural commodities", a view echoed in the book Taming Cannabis that cites Commodifdying Cannabis as "shed[ding] additional light on this vital role played by hemp within the competition of Great Powers in early modern Europe" and in understanding the European colonization of North Africa.

A review in the Journal of American History calls the book "a sophisticated and welcome addition to the growing body of scholarship on marijuana".

Further reading
List of books about cannabis

References

External links
CBD Distillery podcast, April 28, 2020: author speaking on podcast; the history of cannabis going back 100 years and how it was leveraged for many different purposes from medicinal to political as well as a commodity
Points Interview: Bradley Borougerdi, May 28, 2019 

2018 non-fiction books
American books about cannabis
American non-fiction books
Non-fiction books about cannabis
Lexington Books books